The Ministry of Mines is the ministry in the Government of India. The ministry functions as the primary body for the formulation and administration of laws relating to mines in India. The head of the ministry is Pralhad Joshi, who has been serving since June 2019.

Functions
The Ministry of Mines is responsible for surveying and exploring for minerals (other than natural gas and  petroleum) that are used in mining and metallurgy. It searches for non-ferrous metals including: aluminium, copper, zinc, lead, gold, nickel, etc. for administration of Mines and Minerals (Development and Regulation) Act, 1957 (MMDR Act) in respect of all mines and minerals other than coal and lignite. There is one attached office, one subordinate office, three public sector undertakings (PSUs), three autonomous bodies, and additional agencies working under the support of the Ministry of Mines.

Attached office
 
 Geological Survey of India; headquarters at Kolkata

Subordinate office

 Indian Bureau of Mines, headquarters at Nagpur

Public sector undertakings

 National Aluminium Company Limited (NALCO), Bhubaneswar
 Hindustan Copper Limited (HCL),Kolkata
 Mineral Exploration Corporation Limited (MECL), Nagpur

Autonomous bodies

 Jawaharlal Nehru Aluminium Research Development and Design Centre (JNARDDC), Nagpur
 National Institute of Rock Mechanics (NIRM), Kolar
 National Institute of Miners’ Health (NIMH), Nagpur

Registered society (autonomous & self funding)

 Non-Ferrous Technology Development Centre
 Centre for Techno Economic Mineral Policy Options (C-TEMPO)

The subject of ‘mineral regulation and development’ occurs at Serial Number 23 of the State list in the VIIth schedule to the Constitution. However the Constitution circumscribes this power, by giving Parliament the power under S.No. 54 of the Union list in the VIIth schedule, to enact legislation, and to this extent the States will be bound by the Central legislation. The MMDR Act is the main Central legislation in force for the sector. The Act was enacted when the Industrial Policy Resolution, 1957 was the guiding policy for the sector, and thus was aimed primarily at providing a  mineral concession regime in the context of the  metal making public sector undertakings. After the liberalization in 1991, a separate National Mineral Policy (NMP) was promulgated in 1993 which set out the role of the private sector in exploration and mining and the MMDR Act was amended several times to provide for a reasonable concession regime to attract the private sector investment including FDI, into exploration and mining in accordance with NMP 1993.

National Mineral Policy
The first National Mineral Policy was enunciated by the Government in 1993 for liberalization of the mining sector. The National Mineral Policy, 1993 aimed at encouraging the flow of private investment and introduction of state-of-the-art technology in exploration and mining.

In the Mid-Term Appraisal of the Tenth Five-Year Plan, it was observed that the main factors responsible for this were procedural delays in the processing of applications for mineral concessions and the absence of adequate infrastructure in the mining areas. To go into the whole gamut of issues relating to the development of the mineral sector and suggest measures for improving the investment climate the Mid-Term Appraisal had proposed the establishment of a High Level Committee. Accordingly, the Government of India, Planning Commission, constituted a Committee on 14 September 2005. under the Chairmanship of Shri Anwarul Hoda, member, Planning Commission. The Committee made detailed recommendations on all of its terms of Reference in December 2006. Based on the recommendations of the High Level Committee, in consultation with State Governments, the Government replaced the National Mineral Policy, 1993 with a new National Mineral Policy on 13 March 2008.

The National Mineral Policy 2008 provides for a change in the role of the Central Government and the State Governments to incentivize private sector investment in exploration and mining and for ensuring level playing field and transparency in the grant of concessions and promotion of scientific mining within a sustainable development framework so as to protect the interest of local population in mining areas. This has necessitated harmonization of legislation with the new National Mineral Policy.

Policy reforms

The Hoda Committee studied the various reports prepared and submitted by study groups and in- house committees set up by various Ministries from time to time on the issues before the Committee. The Committee gave consideration to the mineral policies of the States as presented by the State Governments, especially to the differing perceptions of mineral-rich and non mineral-rich states. The Committee also gave consideration to the papers prepared by FIMI, which provided comparative analyses of the mineral policies and statutes of other major mineral producing countries in the world such as Australia, Canada, Chile, and South Africa.

Legislation

The Mines and Minerals (Regulation and Development) Act, 1957 was enacted so as to provide for the regulation of mines and development of minerals under the control of the Union. The Act has been amended in 1972, 1986, 1994, 1999 and 2004 in keeping with changes in the policy on mineral development. It has been recently amended in 2016 to make fundamental changes.

Legislative reform

Since that the existing law had already been amended several times and as further amendments may not clearly reflect the objects and reasons emanating from the new Mineral Policy, Government decided  to reformulate the legislative framework in the light of the National Mineral Policy, 2008 and consequently, the Mines and Minerals (Development and Regulation) Bill was drafted in 2009-10 by the then Secretary Mines, S. Vijay Kumar, in consultation with the stakeholders. Government then constituted a Group of Ministers, chaired by the Minister of Finance (comprising Ministers of Home, Environment & Forest, Mines, Steel, Coal, Tribal Affairs, Law etc.) which harmonized the views of the Ministries and the final draft as approved by the Cabinet in September 2011, was introduced in Parliament in November 2011.

The Mines and Minerals (Development and Regulation) Bill, 2011, inter alia, provides for the following, namely
 A simple and transparent mechanism with clear and enforceable timelines for grant of mining lease or prospecting licence through competitive bidding in areas of known mineralization, and on the basis of first-in-time in areas where mineralization is not known.
 "Extension" rather than "renewal" of concession to ensure complete exploitation of mineral deposit.
 Facilitating easy transfer of reconnaissance and prospecting licences; mining leases are also transferable but subject to prior approval of State Government.

A notable feature of the Bill is to provide a simple mechanism which ensures that revenues from mining are shared with local communities at individual as well as community level so as to empower them, provide them with choices, enable them to create and maintain local infrastructure and better utilize infrastructure and other services provided for their benefit. The Bill after introduction in Parliament in November 2011, was referred to the Department–related Parliamentary Standing Committee ("Standing Committee" ) which after eliciting the views of all stakeholders, submitted its Report.

Elections in 2014, however led to the Bill lapsing, and the new NDA Government used its majority to effect amendments in the MMDR Act. The most important amendment has been to make auctions the only way to get mineral concessions at prospecting and mining stages. Some auctions have been held, but the industry view seems to be that auctions are likely to lead to delays and supply interruptions, and that the auction is adding to the burden of taxes on mining. Auctions at mining lease stage are also disincentivising exploration by private sector.

Mining within a sustainable development framework
The Hoda Committee made important recommendations on the need for a Sustainable Development Framework (SDF), as follows:

""The Ministry of Mines and MOEF should jointly set up a working group to prepare a SDF specially tailored to the context of India’s mining environment, taking fully into account the work done and being done in ICMM and the IUCN. The Indian SDF  principles, reporting initiatives, and good practice guidelines unique to the three sectors in Indian mining, i.e. SME, captive, and large stand alone, can then be made applicable to mining operations in India and a separate structure set up to ensure adherence to such framework, drawing from both IBM and the field formations of MOEF.
• The aspect of social infrastructure in the form of schools, hospitals, drinking water arrangements, etc. needs to be addressed within a formalised framework on the lines of the ICMM model. The Samatha ruling requiring mining companies to spend a set percentage of their profits on model programmes for meeting local needs through a pre-determined commitment, is one option for the country as a whole. Another option could be to require the mining companies to spend a percentage, say three per cent, of their turnover on the social infrastructure in the villages around the mining area. The working group mentioned in paragraph 3.11 may take this into consideration when preparing the Indian SDF and determine the percentage that mining companies could be advised to set aside. "

Based on these recommendations, the National Mineral Policy 2008 explicitly underlined the need for mining within a sustainable development framework. The National Mineral Policy 2008 states, ( para numbers in brackets are the para numbers in the Policy):
" (2.3) A framework of sustainable development will be designed which takes care of biodiversity issues and to ensure that mining activity takes place along with suitable measures for restoration of the ecological balance..."

In para 7.10 it states" Extraction of minerals closely impacts other natural resources like land, water, air and forest. The areas in which minerals occur often have other resources presenting a choice of utilisation of the resources. Some such areas are ecologically fragile and some are biologically rich. It is necessary to take a comprehensive view to facilitate the choice or order of land use keeping in view the needs of development as well as the needs of protecting the forests, environment and ecology... All mining shall be undertaken within the parameters of a comprehensive Sustainable Development Framework... Mining operations shall not ordinarily be taken up in identified ecologically fragile areas and biologically rich areas.

Para 7.11  states that "Appropriate compensation will form an important aspect of the Sustainable Development Framework mentioned in para 2.3 and 7.10…"

Para 7.12 states that: "Once the process of economical extraction of a mine is complete there is need for scientific mine closure which will not only restore ecology and regenerate biomass  but also take into account the socio-economic aspects of such closure..."

And not least, para 3.2 of the Policy states that "The Central Govt in consultation with the State Govts shall formulate the legal measures for giving effect to the NMP 2008..The MMDR Act, MCR and MCDR will be amended in line with the policy…"

In line with the Hoda Committee recommendations, the Ministry of Mines commissioned ERM which prepared a Sustainable Development Framework Report in November 2011.

List of Ministers

List of Ministers of State

References

External links
Ministry website

 
Mines
Mining in India